Original Seeds: Songs that inspired Nick Cave and the Bad Seeds is a various artist compilation, which was initially released in June 1998. It was re-titled as Original Seeds Volume 1: Songs That Inspired Nick Cave and the Bad Seeds when the follow-up Original Seeds Volume 2: Songs That Inspired Nick Cave and the Bad Seeds appeared in 2004. Both appeared on the Rubber Records label in Australia and the United Kingdom.

The liner notes by the producer, Kim Beissel, describe the link between each track and works by Australian musician, Nick Cave, generally with his group, the Bad Seeds throughout their related careers. Most tracks were directly covered by Cave, while some were adapted, or borrowed from, to form new songs.

In January 2009 Beissel appeared as a DJ at the Cave-curated festival, All Tomorrow's Parties at Mount Buller, Australia.

In 2019, Cave curated a Spotify playlist "Nick Cave's Hidden Songs" which included the original artist's recordings of "Avalanche", "Katie Cruel", "Tupelo Blues", and "Plain Gold Ring", as well as songs by Bob Dylan, Van Morrison, Neil Young and others.

Inspirations 
While the liner notes reference many songs, the songs included on each CD that Beissel claims partly inspired new Cave songs are as follows:

Volume 1 – "Katie Cruel" ("When I First Came to Town"), "Tupelo Blues" ("Tupelo"), "Another Man Done Gone" ("The Good Son"), "I’m Gonna Run to the City of Refuge" ("City of Refuge"), "Oh Happy Day" ("Deanna")

Volume 2 – "Way Down in the Hole" ("Red Right Hand"), "Sara" ("Where Do We Go Now But Nowhere?"), "Perfect Day" ("There is a Kingdom"), "Street Fight" ("Hamlet (Pow, Pow, Pow)").

Reception

Critical reception 

Both volumes received positive critical reactions. Of Volume 1, in September 1998 Tracey Grimson of Australian Rolling Stone gave the album four stars, writing "Altogether stunning...a journey through music's flirtation with death, love and the rest.". Patrick Donovan of The Age gave the album four stars and declared it "Album of the week" (24/07/1998), stating "the presentation is faultless".  Of Volume 2, Noel Mengel of The Courier Mail wrote "An album of startling contrasts...plays like a dream radio station" (09/10/2004); Michael Dwyer of The Age called it "An inspired work of cultural archaeology" (02/10/2004); Stephen Fitzpatrick of The Weekend Australian called it "The perfect journey through pop's wilderness" (23/10/2004); Malena Rydell of Dagens Nyheter (Daily News, Sweden) wrote "A bunch of truly fantastic tracks" (01/12/2004).

Track listing

Volume two

Sources
Original Seeds: Songs that inspired Nick Cave & the Bad Seeds, Kim Beissel, CD liner notes, Rubber Records Australia, 1998
Original Seeds Vol. 2: Songs that inspired Nick Cave & the Bad Seeds, Kim Beissel, CD liner notes, Rubber Records Australia, 2004

References

Nick Cave and the Bad Seeds
Original Seeds: Songs that inspired Nick Cave
Original Seeds: Songs that inspired Nick Cave
Compilation album series
Rock compilation albums